Amplypterus sumbawanensis is a species of moth of the  family Sphingidae. It is known from Sumba.

References

Amplypterus
Moths described in 2006
Moths of Indonesia